Port Murray is an unincorporated community and census-designated place (CDP) located within Mansfield Township in Warren County, New Jersey, United States, that was created as part of the 2010 United States Census. As of the 2010 Census, the CDP's population was 129.  

The community was long known by this name for its location on the Morris Canal and after Colonel James Boyles Murray, the third president of the Morris Canal and Banking Company.

The area is served as United States Postal Service ZIP code 07865.

Geography
According to the United States Census Bureau, the CDP had a total area of 0.168 square miles (0.435 km2), including 0.167 square miles (0.433 km2) of land and 0.001 square miles (0.002 km2) of water (0.57%).

Demographics

Census 2000
As of the 2000 United States Census, the population for ZIP Code Tabulation Area 07865 was 2,010.

Census 2010

Transportation

Historic district
The Port Murray Historic District was added to the National Register of Historic Places on June 7, 1996.

Gallery

References

Census-designated places in Warren County, New Jersey
Mansfield Township, Warren County, New Jersey